Lowndes County School District or Lowndes County Public Schools may refer to:
Lowndes County School District (Alabama)
Lowndes County School District (Georgia)
Lowndes County School District (Mississippi)